Štefan Miroslav "Mirko" Messner (born 16 December 1948) is an Austrian, Carinthian Slovene Slavicist and communist politician, leading the Communist Party of Austria (KPÖ) from February 2006 to June 2021.

Life
After graduating from high school, Messner studied Slavic studies and German studies at the University of Vienna, where he received his doctorate in 1977.

After its dissolution in 1973, Messner joined the KPÖ-led Communist Student Union within the Austrian Students' Association. During his studies he became involved in the Slovene Students' Association and created the Slovenian student newspaper Kladivo, which was published until 1989. When he could not assert his view of nationality policy on the question of Slovenian minority in the party, Messner resigned from all party offices, including membership of the central committee, and quit his job as an employee of the party in 1987.

In March of the same year, Messner was also elected Federal Spokesperson for the party together with Melina Klaus. Messner has been the leading candidate for his party in all four Austrian National Council elections since 2006.

From 2009 to 2016 he was also editor of the party newspaper Volksstimme, which appears as a monthly magazine. Messner has been the sole federal spokesman for the KPÖ from 2012 to 2021.

Notes

References

1948 births
Austrian communists
Austrian journalists
Communist writers
Carinthian Slovenes
Communist Party of Austria politicians
Living people
Slavists
University of Vienna alumni